I'll Lead You Home is a 1995 album by Michael W. Smith released by Reunion Records.

Sales and charts 

The album entered the Billboard 200 at number 16, making it the highest-debuting Christian album in the history of the chart. It also topped the 'Top Contemporary Christian' chart. Released in August 1995, by December of that year it had sold over 51,500 copies in the Christian Bookstore market alone.

Reception 

The album received a four and a half out of five star review from Allmusic, with Stephen Thomas Erlewine commenting on the "gospel songs with glistening, immaculate pop production". James Lloyd, reviewing the album for the Dayton Daily News considered it "his best work to date".

The album won the 1996 Grammy Award in the 'Best Pop-Contemporary Gospel Album' category, giving Smith his second Grammy win.

Tour 

Smith toured in support of the album in 1996. Support came from Lori and Micah Wilshire (who he subsequently signed to his Rocketown Records label), Three Crosses, and Jars of Clay. Micah Wilshire had contributed backing vocals to the album.

Track listing

Personnel 
Musicians

 Michael W. Smith – vocals, keyboards (1–7, 11–14), programming (4, 11), acoustic piano (8, 9, 10, 13)
 Patrick Leonard – keyboards (1, 2), drum programming (2), organ (5, 10, 12, 13), synthesizer programming (14)
 Dennis Patton – programming (2, 4, 7)
 Dann Huff – guitars (1–3, 5–7, 11–13)
 Bruce Gaitsch – acoustic guitar (5)
 Paul Franklin – steel guitar (5, 11, 14)
 Tommy Sims – bass (1, 3, 5–7, 11–13)
 Leland Sklar – bass (10, 14)
 Steve Brewster – drums (1, 3, 5, 6, 12, 13)
 Chris McHugh – drums (2)
 Marc Moreau – drum programming (6)
 Vinnie Colaiuta – drums (7)
 Brian MacLeod – drums (10, 11), additional programming (11)
 Luis Conte – percussion (1, 3, 5–7, 10–13)
 Jeremy Lubbock – orchestra arrangements and conductor (8, 9, 10)
 Brent Bourgeois – backing vocals (1, 4, 6)
 Tim Erwin – backing vocals (1)
 Molly Felder – backing vocals (1)
 Chris Rodriguez – backing vocals (1, 12)
 Susan Ashton – harmony vocals (5)
 Lisa Cochran – backing vocals (5, 11, 12)
 Reneé Garcia-Bliss – backing vocals (5)
 Micah Wilshire – backing vocals (5)
 Natalie Jackson – backing vocals (6, 10)
 Louis Johnson – backing vocals (6, 7, 10)
 Richard Page – backing vocals (6, 7, 10)
 Whitney Smith – guest vocal (10)
 Gardner Cole – backing vocals (11)
 Chris Harris – backing vocals (12)
 Anointed (Nee-C Walls, Steve Crawford, Da'dra Crawford and Mary Tiller) – featured vocals (13)
 Bob Bailey – choir (3, 7, 12, 13)
 Kim Fleming – choir (3, 7, 12, 13)
 Vicki Hampton – choir (3, 7, 12, 13)
 Chris Harris – choir (3, 7, 12, 13)
 Donna McElroy – vocal coordinator, choir (3, 7, 12, 13)
 Michael Mellett – choir (3, 7, 12, 13)
 Nicole C. Mullen – choir (3, 7, 12, 13)
 Angelo and Veronica Petrucci – choir (3, 7, 12, 13)
 Chris Rodriguez – choir (3, 7, 12, 13)
 Micah Wilshire – choir (3, 7, 12, 13)

Production 

 Patrick Leonard – producer
 Michael W. Smith – executive producer
 Michael Blanton – executive producer
 Don Donahue – A&R
 Keith Compton – engineer
 Craig Hansen – engineer, mixing (1, 4)
 Jerry Jordan – engineer, mixing (11, 14)
 Bryan Lenox – engineer
 Marc Moreau – engineer
 David Thoener – mixing (2, 3, 5–10)
 Bill Deaton – mixing (12, 13)
 Rob Burrell – second engineer
 Dave Dillbeck – second engineer
 David Faulkner – second engineer
 Mike Janas – second engineer
 Patrick Kelly – second engineer
 Scott Lenox – second engineer
 Al Lay – second engineer
 Paula Montondo – second engineer
 Greg Parker – second engineer
 Dennis Patton – second engineer
 Krish Sharma – second engineer
 Darren Smith – second engineer
 J.T. Thomas – second engineer
 Jason Wilder – second engineer
 Jeff Wright – second engineer
 Caribou Ranch (Nederland, Colorado) – recording studio
 Johnny Yuma (Burbank, California) – recording studio
 A&M Studios (Los Angeles, California) – recording studio
 The Sound Kitchen (Franklin, Tennessee) – recording studio
 Deer Valley (Franklin, Tennessee) – recording studio
 The Castle (Franklin, Tennessee) – recording studio
 Studio at Mole End (Franklin, Tennessee) – recording studio
 Masterfonics (Nashville, Tennessee) – recording studio
 Sixteenth Avenue Sound (Nashville, Tennessee) – recording studio
 Gambit Studio (Gallatin, Tennessee) – recording studio
 Doug Sax – mastering at The Mastering Lab (North Hollywood, California)
 Pat Dorn – production coordinator
 Derek Jones – production coordinator
 Sandra Tomes – production coordinator
 Rob Birkhead – art direction
 Buddy Jackson – design, for Jackson Design
 Karrine Caulkins – design, for Jackson Design
 Diana Lussenden – creative assistant
 Timothy White – cover photography 
 Ben Pearson – tray card photo, inside photos
 Russ Harrington – inside photos

Chart performance

References 

Michael W. Smith albums
1995 albums
Grammy Award for Best Pop/Contemporary Gospel Album
Reunion Records albums